Vertically Challenged is the debut EP from UK hip hop artist Lady Sovereign. It was only released in the U.S. and Australia.

The EP features the UK hit single "Random" and a remix of her limited edition white-label single "Ch Ching (Cheque 1 2)".

In the US, a limited edition was manufactured containing a bonus DVD. The limited edition was not released in Australia.

Critical reception
The Detroit Metro Times wrote that the EP "suitably reps Lady Sovereign’s ample cockiness and lyrical zing." Slate commended Sovereign's "tunefully bratty delivery." Billboard praised Vertically Challengeds "hands-in-the-air breakbeats, Colecovision sound effects, [and] nut-job lyrics delivered in great Cockney fashion."

Track listingCD: "Random"
 "Ch Ching (Cheque 1 2) (Remix)"
 "Fiddle with the Volume"
 "Random" (Menta Remix featuring Riko)
 "A Little Bit of Shhh"
 "The Battle" (Featuring Frost P, Shystie & Zuz Rock)
 "A Little Bit of Shhh" (Smallstars Remix by Adrock)
 "Fiddle with the Volume" (Ghislain Poirier Remix)Limited Edition DVD: 30-minute documentary - including the videos for "Random", "Ch Ching (Cheque 1 2)", "A Little Bit of Shhh" and "Random (Menta Remix featuring Riko)."12" Vinyl:'

Side A
"Random"
 "Ch Ching (Cheque 1 2) (Remix)"

Side B
 "Fiddle with the Volume"
 "Random" (Menta Remix featuring Riko)

Side C
 "A Little Bit of Shhh"
 "The Battle" (Featuring Frost P, Shystie & Zuz Rock)

Side D
 "A Little Bit of Shhh" (Smallstars Remix by Adrock)
 "Fiddle with the Volume" (Ghislain Poirier Remix)
 Ch Ching (Spank Rock Remix)

The EP was only available in a "Censored" or "clean/edited" form, which removed all profanity with backmasking.

References

2005 debut EPs
Lady Sovereign albums